Pterostylis nigricans, commonly known as the dark greenhood, is a species of orchid endemic to eastern Australia. As with similar orchids, the flowering plants differ from those which are not flowering. The non-flowering plants have a rosette of leaves but the flowering plants lack a rosette at the base but have up to six tiny green, white and brown flowers which have a rough texture.

Description
Pterostylis nigricans is a terrestrial, perennial, deciduous, herb with an underground tuber and when not flowering, a rosette of three to eleven egg-shaped to heart-shaped leaves. Up to three leaf rosettes are arranged on separate stems at the base of the flowering spike. The flowers are green and white with a dark chocolate-brown tip and have a rough surface texture. The dorsal sepal and petals are fused, forming a hood or "galea" over the column. The dorsal sepal curves forward and has a short point. The sinus between the bases of the lateral sepals almost closes off the front of the flower and has a small notch in the centre. Flowering occurs from March to May.

Taxonomy and naming
Pterostylis nigricans was first formally described in 1988 by David Jones and Mark Clements from a specimen collected on Stradbroke Island and the description was published in the Austrobaileya. The specific epithet (nigricans) is a Latin word meaning "blackish", referring to the dark colour of the flowers.

Distribution and habitat
The dark greenhood grows in forest, scrub and heath in coastal and near-coastal areas of south-eastern Queensland and in New South Wales north of Evans Head.

References

nigricans
Endemic orchids of Australia
Orchids of New South Wales
Orchids of Queensland
Plants described in 1988